Albert Ulmann (born 1861) was an American banker and author.

Ulmann was a graduate of the College of the City of New York.  He became a member of the New York Stock Exchange in 1900.

External links
 
Tales of Old New York: Part 1. New York: D Appleton and Company, 1917. Scanned book from Internet Archive.
Albert Ulmann, from the Jewish Encyclopedia.
 Finding aid to Albert Ulmann papers at Columbia University. Rare Book & Manuscript Library.

1861 births
Year of death missing
Jewish American bankers